The sepia stingray (Urolophus aurantiacus) is a species of fish in the family Urolophidae. It is found in Japan, Taiwan, Vietnam, possibly North Korea, and possibly South Korea. It is threatened by habitat loss.

References

External links
 Fishes of Australia : Urolophus aurantiacus

sepia stingray
East China Sea
Marine fauna of East Asia
Taxa named by Johannes Peter Müller
Taxa named by Friedrich Gustav Jakob Henle
sepia stingray
Taxonomy articles created by Polbot